Liu Lili  (born ) is a Chinese female track cyclist, representing China at international competitions. During the 2016–17 UCI Track Cycling World Cup she won in the team sprint at round one in Glasgow the silver medal in at round two in Apeldoorn the bronze medal.

Career results
2014
Hong Kong International Track Cup
2nd Team Pursuit (with Han Cuiping, He Junyao and Xing Feixue)
3rd 500m Time Trial
2016
Japan Track Cup
3rd Sprint
3rd Sprint
3rd Sprint, China Track Cup

References

1994 births
Living people
Chinese female cyclists
Chinese track cyclists
Place of birth missing (living people)
21st-century Chinese women